Arjun Kanungo is an Indian singer, actor, composer and entrepreneur. He is a trained Indian classical singer and plays the piano & guitar. He is a 3-time national Gold Medal winner in Centre Fire Pistol and a national level Basketball player.

Early life
Kanungo was born and raised in Mumbai. He is a trained method actor from Lee Strasberg Theatre and Film Institute in New York City.

Career
At the age of 18, Kanungo opened a recording studio in Mumbai called Promethean Audio. Soon after, he diversified into acoustic design and construction with his second venture, Promethean Design. He gained popularity after his stint as a playback singer for movies including Go Goa Gone and Pizza. As a vocalist, Arjun has toured India, Dubai, Australia and Sri Lanka with Asha Bhosle, in addition to solo shows. He is also active as a composer for TV ads and background musical scores and has worked with brands such as Nike Cricket and ESPN.

Kanungo's first commercial success came with "Khoon Choos Le" in the 2013 film Go Goa Gone, starring Saif Ali Khan. Since then he has churned out 3 hit singles in 2 years- Baaki Baatein Peene Baad ft. Badshah, Fursat, and Ek Dafaa (Chinnama). His track Ek Daffa (Chinnama) was remixed by DJ Akhil Talreja. Arjun has lent his voice to several Bollywood films. His Tamil Debut came with 'Sirrikadhey', composed by Anirudh Ravichander, from the film 'Remo'.

His debut single Baaki Baatein Peene Baad was released on 25 September 2015 by Sony Music India. The song was written by Mayur Puri and was composed, written, recorded and produced in Sweden The song features the rapper Badshah. Baaki Baatein Peene Baad went viral on YouTube upon its release and subsequently climbed the TV and radio charts.

His second single, Fursat, was eventually released on 18 March by Sony Music India.

He made his UK debut with a live stage performance at the Asian Network 2017, in March.

He made his debut in Bollywood alongside Salman Khan in Radhe (2021 film). He acted as Mansoor, a drug dealer in Radhe (2021 film).

Awards and honors

Filmography

Films

Discography

Personal Life 
Kanungo married Carla Dennis, his longtime girlfriend, on 10 August 2022 after dating for seven years. 

As a nature enthusiast, Kanungo promotes green energy and other alternative energy sources. He has also planted over 800 trees.

References

External links 

 

Living people
Indian male playback singers
Indian male pop singers
Indian male composers
Musicians from Mumbai
1990 births